The 2004 CAF Confederation Cup was the first edition of the newly created CAF Confederation Cup. Hearts of Oak of Ghana beat fellow Ghanaians Asante Kotoko 8-7 on penalties in the final after the two legs ended 2-2.

Qualifying rounds

Preliminary round

|}

First round

|}

1 Mtibwa Sugar withdrew before the 2nd leg. but mtibwa sugar was seemed to be challenging team in Tanzania

Second round

|}

Play-off round
In this round, the 8 winners of the round of 16 play the losers of the round of 16 of the Champions League for 8 places in the group stage.

|}

Notes

Group stage

Group A

Group B

Knockout stage

Final

Top goal scorers

The top scorers from the 2004 CAF Confederation Cup are as follows:

External links
 2004 CAF Confederation - CAF official website
 Confederation Cup 2004 - rsssf.com

 
CAF Confederation Cup
2